Chinook was a provincial electoral district in Alberta mandated to return a single member to the Legislative Assembly of Alberta using the first past the post method of voting from 1979 to 1996.

History
The electoral district was created following boundary redistribution for the 1979 Alberta general election from Hanna-Oyen and Sedgewick-Coronation electoral districts.

The electoral district would be combined with Drumheller in 1996 to form Drumheller-Chinook.

Members of the Legislative Assembly (MLAs)

Electoral history

1970s

1980s

1990s

See also
List of Alberta provincial electoral districts
Chinook, Alberta, a hamlet in southern Alberta, Canada
Chinook wind, föhn winds in the interior west of North America

References

Further reading

External links
Elections Alberta
The Legislative Assembly of Alberta

Former provincial electoral districts of Alberta
Drumheller